Bukovec pri Poljanah (in older sources also Bukovica) is a small settlement north of Velike Poljane in the Municipality of Ribnica in southern Slovenia. The area is part of the traditional region of Lower Carniola and is now included in the Southeast Slovenia Statistical Region.

Name
The name of the settlement was changed from Bukovec to Bukovec pri Poljanah in 1955. In the past the German name was Bukowitz.

References

External links
Bukovec pri Poljanah on Geopedia

Populated places in the Municipality of Ribnica